Pippara is a village and major panchayat in West Godavari district of the Indian state of Andhra Pradesh. It is located in Ganapavaram mandal.

Demographics 

 census, Pippara had a population of 7,719. The total population constituted 3,835 males and 3,884 females — a ratio of 1013 females per 1000 males. 731 children were in the age group of 0–6 years, of which 354 were boys and 377 were girls. The average literacy rate stands at 75.06%.

References

External links 

Villages in West Godavari district